Vizefeldwebel Erich Buder (14 January 1896 – 24 May 1975) was a World War I flying ace credited with twelve aerial victories.

Aerial service in World War I

Buder served with Jagdstaffel 84 before transferring to Jagdstaffel 26. He scored his wins with this squadron between 26 March and 4 November 1918, with two victories possibly unconfirmed at war's end. He was transferred to Kampfeinsitzerstaffel 6 as the war ended. Besides the First and Second Class Iron Cross, he received the Golden Military Merit Cross, which was the enlisted men's equivalent of the Blue Max, on 2 November 1918.

Aerial victory list

Buder's final two victories may not have been officially confirmed.

Sources of information

References

Above the Lines: The Aces and Fighter Units of the German Air Service, Naval Air Service and Flanders Marine Corps 1914 - 1918 Norman L. R. Franks, et al. Grub Street, 1993. .

1896 births
1975 deaths
German World War I flying aces
Luftstreitkräfte personnel
People from Frankfurt (Oder)
People from the Province of Brandenburg
Recipients of the Iron Cross (1914), 1st class
Military personnel from Brandenburg